The Missouri Western Griffons football program represents Missouri Western State University in college football and competes in the Division II level (D-II) of the National Collegiate Athletics Association (NCAA). In 1989, Missouri Western became a member of the Missouri Intercollegiate Athletic Association, which was renamed the Mid-America Intercollegiate Athletics Association (MIAA), and has remained in the league. Missouri Western's home games are played at Spratt Stadium in St. Joseph, Missouri.

Missouri Western's football program dates back to 1970. The Griffons won two conference championships, in 2003 and 2012. Under Jerry Partridge the Griffons have appeared in the Division II playoffs in 2006, 2010, 2011, and 2012.

The team is coached by Tyler Fenwick, who enters his first season in 2023.

History

Conference affiliations
 Central States Intercollegiate Conference (1976–1988)
 Mid-America Intercollegiate Athletics Association (1989–present)

Conference championships

All-time record vs. current MIAA teams
Official record (including any NCAA imposed vacates and forfeits) against all current MIAA opponents as of the end of the 2015 season:

Stadium

The Griffons have played their home games at Spratt Stadium since 1979. The current capacity of the stadium is at 7,200.

References

External links
 

 
American football teams established in 1970
1970 establishments in Missouri